is a fictional character created by Monkey Punch for his manga series Lupin III, which debuted in Weekly Manga Action on August 10, 1967. Jigen is the marksman, aide-de-camp and best friend of Arsène Lupin III. Along with colleague Goemon Ishikawa XIII, he joins Lupin in pursuit of riches acquired typically by theft. Traveling across the globe, Jigen has garnered fame as a gunman with a wildly capable speed and accuracy.

Creation and conception
According to Monkey Punch, Jigen was created as a New York raised American gangster based on actor James Coburn, especially his role in The Magnificent Seven. When the series was adapted into animation, the role was portrayed by Kiyoshi Kobayashi, the voice actor responsible for dubbing many of Coburn's roles into Japanese. The character's name comes from Monkey Punch's love for the word "dimension," which translates to "jigen" in Japanese. In an interview with Mainichi Shimbun, he stated the name is a corruption of the Japanese phrase .

Skills
Jigen is master thief Arsène Lupin III's right-hand man and sharpshooter. He can perform a 0.3-second quick-draw, providing accuracy that borders on superhuman.  With ease he can shoot skeet with a handgun, explode a missile before it hits by targeting the warhead, and deflect another bullet by shooting it in mid-flight.

Known by his trademark broad-brimmed fedora pulled over his eyes and short chin curtain beard, Jigen's favorite ploy is the trick shot. Jolting a large object into the air with gunfire and using it to clobber an enemy or shooting overhanging deco such as a chandelier to drop and encumber a group are just two of his many non-lethal tactics.  In the second anime series, a non-canonic story implies he uses a notch on the hat for aiming; actually he can fire accurately without the hat and has done so several times.

A master of many different firearms, Jigen's armory includes revolvers, machine guns, sniper rifles, and even a PTRS anti-tank rifle. His preferred carry-around is a Smith & Wesson Model 19 combat revolver usually tucked in the back of his pants or housed in a fabric belt holster. He prefers the Model 19 due to its stopping power and reliability against misfire. He feels quite not himself without a gun: The Fuma Conspiracy shows a disarmed Jigen instinctively aiming with his empty hand.

Personality
In the original manga series, Jigen is not always at Lupin's side but lurking in the background until needed. The anime series, however, shows Jigen as extremely loyal to Lupin and willing to partner up anytime for a given heist. 

Jigen is noted for his quick temper; enemy and friend alike have been victim to his need to repay violence for insult. Both Lupin and Goemon have been on the receiving end of his blows in his response to their frank or comical criticism.

Despite Jigen's gruff facade, he has an ironic sense of humor and genuinely enjoys participating in each caper with his partners. He is, by far, the more pragmatic of the group, with a cynical streak founded in failed romances (his luck with women runs from bad to worse, with love interests often betraying him or dying). He is always distrustful of Fujiko Mine and becomes irritated when Lupin goes along with one of her plans. Among Lupin's group, Jigen is the least apprehensive at taking human life. While he considers killing women and children taboo, he is willing to put down any age or gender who offers a life threat, such as Linda in Part 2 Episode 26.

Where Lupin and Goemon Ishikawa XIII both have unique sartorial tastes, Jigen is pure basics. His typical wardrobe is a dark grey, dark green or black business suit, along with a white or light blue colored dress shirt, a black tie, and his ever-present dark grey or black broad-brimmed fedora; the hat ranks as his most prized possession outside of his weaponry. During the third anime series, Jigen's outfit is more light colored and his hatband has a cross-hatched or grid pattern design (similar to the original manga interpretation of the character); however the black look is most applied for OVA productions and TV specials. Jigen's thick hair is typically collar-length and unevenly cut. His chin curtain beard varies from an inch to three inches long and is also unruly.  A few episodes of the anime use an occasional gimmick where the character has his hat pulled forward so that only the lower half of his face is visible or, if he's without his hat, his hair will be covering his upper face and eyes.  However such episodes are rare; and Jigen's face is plainly shown with or without his hat in most animated depictions.

Jigen is the "big brother" of the group, and often serves as the voice of reason to Lupin's impulsiveness, as he must because of his friendship with Lupin as well as out of sheer professionalism. However, he has long since resigned himself to having to go along with the craziest of schemes. Jigen, like the rest of the Lupin gang, is adept with disguises and can pilot virtually any motorized vehicle. He is also a tough hand-to-hand opponent, capable of knocking out an attacker with one blow.

While his racial origins may be in question, Jigen was at one time a famed bodyguard and assassin for many American criminal mobs. Of several stories regarding his past, the most popular has him an American mobster who moved to Japan on the lam; there he adopted a Japanese identity and name ("Jigen" is the conventional Japanese word for "dimension", not a name). According to Lupin, Jigen's hobbies are limited due to his stay-at-home preference. When he does go out, he usually attends target practice, visits a favorite bar, plays poker, enjoys a boxing match or eats at a chop house-style restaurant. He also has a weakness for Spaghetti Westerns, lounging, classical music (except in Episodes 79 and 89 of Part 2), and hearty American food.

Jigen's most obvious pastime is smoking; there is hardly a time when he not seen with a cigarette, usually one bent in a number of directions. His preferred brands have been Pall Mall Filter Longs or Marlboro Red. He is also seen occasionally smoking a briar pipe. As well, Jigen enjoys drinking scotch, bourbon, vodka, beer and occasionally fine wines; he has a "heavyweight's" resistance to intoxication.

The Tokyo Pop releases of the original Lupin manga note in their preface that Jigen's appearance and temperament are based on the actor James Coburn, especially Coburn's role, Britt, in The Magnificent Seven.  This has been confirmed by Monkey Punch during a 2003 Dallas, Texas anime convention interview.  In a television documentary celebrating the manga's history, Monkey Punch stated he based the Jigen/Lupin relationship on Alain Delon and Charles Bronson's teaming in the 1968 film Adieu l'ami.

ADDENDUM:  TMS Entertainment's 2023's anime release of the series Lupin Zero indicates Lupin and Jigen were children together in mid 1960's Japan, with Jigen having access to guns and well-developed marksmanship.  Whether this is series is considered canon has yet to be revealed.

Appearances

Manga
Jigen first appeared in chapter 7 of the manga .

Anime

In the anime series, Jigen is an expert gunman who can shoot in 0.3 second with his Smith & Wesson Model 19. Although his M19 is his preferred weapon, he is skilled in a number of different firearms.

Live-action
The character was portrayed by Kunie Tanaka in the 1974 Japanese live-action film Lupin III: Strange Psychokinetic Strategy. The 2014 feature film featured Tetsuji Tamayama in the role.

Voice actors
Daisuke Jigen was first voiced by Kiyoshi Kobayashi in both versions of the 1969 pilot film for the first anime, and he continued to voice the character for over fifty years. On September 7, 2021, a spokesperson for Kobayashi announced his retirement from the role; Kobayashi was the last remaining member of the franchise's original voice cast. Part 6 featured Kobayashi's final performance in its first episode, with Akio Ōtsuka taking over the role for the remainder of the series. In the Lupin Zero prequel ONA series, Jigen is voiced by Shunsuke Takeuchi.

Prior to his retirement, Kobayashi's only absence from the role of Jigen had been for the 1987 original video animation The Fuma Conspiracy. Citing budget concerns, TMS declined to employ the regular voice cast; Banjō Ginga instead voiced Jigen in the film.

Daisuke Jigen's English voice actor in the 1979 Toho dub of The Mystery of Mamo (in which the character was renamed "Dan Dunn") was not credited but is typically identified as Cliff Harrington. Steve Bulen voiced the character in several dubs produced by Streamline Pictures. Sean P. O'Connell (1995, AnimEigo). Eric Meyers (1996, Manga UK). John Snyder (2000, Animaze/Manga). Christopher Sabat voiced the character for Funimation Entertainment's dubs of several TV specials and theatrical films between 2002 and 2005, and for their 2013 dub of The Woman Called Fujiko Mine. Richard Epcar voiced Jigen in the Phuuz dub for Pioneer/Geneon's release of the second anime between 2003 and 2006, and reprises the role for Discotek Media's dubs of the fifth and sixth anime as well as several films and specials. Dan Woren voiced Jigen in the Bang Zoom! Entertainment dub for Discotek's 2015 release of the Jigen's Gravestone film and its two sequels.

Reception
Jigen has been referred to in other anime and manga such as Excel Saga. Anime historian Carl Horn has described Jigen as "The epitome of cool".

References

Lupin the Third characters
Comics characters introduced in 1967
Fictional assassins in comics
Fictional Japanese people in anime and manga
Fictional marksmen and snipers
Male characters in anime and manga